The Mortimer Building was a 19th-century building located at Wall Street and New Street in the Financial District of Manhattan, New York City. It was built by W.Y. Mortimer beginning
on June 1, 1884, and completed for occupancy in March 1885.  The architect was George B. Post.  It fronted Wall Street for a distance of fifty-seven feet and New Street for sixty-five feet. Used entirely as an office building, the structure adjoined the New York Stock Exchange Building on the west and south. Tenants included lawyers, brokers, and bankers.

The New York Stock Exchange acquired the Mortimer Building for $745,000 in December 1918. Reasons for the acquisition included consolidating all of the adjuncts of the exchange beneath one roof and the necessity for additional floor space for foreign issues, entertained by the NYSE. The site was valued at $710,000 in February 1920; $745,000 with the building
included.

Interior design and history

Its rooms were light, arranged in suites and singly. The walls were made primarily of mahogany. The halls were wainscoted in marble and mahogany. The stairways were composed of iron and stone. The structure was considered fireproof from top to bottom. Modern conveniences included steam gas, electric lights, and two speedy elevators.

Previous structures  

The 1884 Mortimer Building replaced an earlier edifice with the same name, built in 1835 by Richard Mortimer (1790 - 1882). The latter structure was constructed in accordance with the Mortimer estate, William Yates Mortimer executor.

Richard Mortimer had commissioned another Mortimer Building at 935-939 Broadway from architect Griffith Thomas.  This 1862 structure, which held the early offices of the American Institute of Architects, still stands as of 2018.

References

1885 establishments in New York (state)
Demolished buildings and structures in Manhattan
Office buildings in Manhattan
History of Manhattan
Cultural history of New York City
Commercial buildings completed in 1885
Financial District, Manhattan
Wall Street